Lynx is a multiple rocket launcher developed and manufactured by Israel Military Industries (IMI) and used by Israel Defense Forces and other countries.

It can be configured to carry a variety of rockets in two sealed pod containers: 40 (2 pods x 20 rockets each) 122mm Grad rockets; or 26 (2x13) 160mm LAR-160 or ACCULAR rockets; or eight (2x4) 306mm EXTRA rockets; or four (2x2) Predator Hawk tactical ballistic missiles; or two (2x1) Delilah missiles.

After the acquisition of Israel Military Industries by Elbit Systems in 2018, an upgraded and modernized version of the Lynx was developed, called the PULS (Precise & Universal Launching System).

In January 2023 Denmark announced it is negotiating the acquisition of 8 PULS systems from Elbit.

See also

 ACCULAR
 TOS-1
 M270 Multiple Launch Rocket System
 HIMARS
 Astros II MLRS
 LRSVM Morava
 T-122 Sakarya
 Fajr-5
 BM-21 Grad

References

Self-propelled artillery of Israel
Wheeled self-propelled rocket launchers
Salvo weapons
Multiple rocket launchers
Modular rocket launchers